The Western Province ( Basnāhira Paḷāta;  Mael Mākāṇam) is one of the nine provinces of Sri Lanka, the first level administrative division of the country. The provinces have existed since the 19th century but did not have any legal status until 1987 when the 13th Amendment to the Constitution of Sri Lanka established provincial councils. Western Province is the most densely populated province in the country and is home to the legislative capital Sri Jayawardenepura Kotte as well as to Colombo, the nation's administrative and business center.

History
Parts of present-day Western Province were part of the pre-colonial Kingdom of Kotte. The province then came under Portuguese, Dutch and British control. In 1815 the British gained control of the entire island of Ceylon. They divided the island into three ethnic based administrative structures: Low Country Sinhalese, Kandyan Sinhalese and Tamil. The Western Province was part of the Low Country Sinhalese administration. In 1833, in accordance with the recommendations of the Colebrooke-Cameron Commission, the ethnic based administrative structures were unified into a single administration divided into five geographic provinces. The districts of Chilaw, Colombo, Kalutara, Puttalam, Seven Korales (present day Kurunegala District), Three Korales, Four Korales and Lower Bulatgama (present day Kegalle District) formed the new Western Province. Chilaw District, Puttalam District and Seven Korales were transferred to the newly created North Western Province in 1845. Three Korales, Four Korales and Lower Bulatgama were transferred to the newly created Sabaragamuwa Province in 1889.

It is planned to create a planned Megacity under the Western Region Megapolis Plan in the Western Province designed by Surbana. Originally initiated in 2004 by Ranil Wickremesinghe it was stopped after his election defeat and was restarted again after his return to power in 2015. The project plans to merge Colombo, Gampaha and Kalutara districts and introduce zoning

Geography and climate
Western Province is located in the southwest of Sri Lanka. The province is surrounded by the Laccadive Sea to the west, North Western Province to the north, Sabaragamuwa Province to the east and the Southern Province to the south.

The Western Province is vulnerable to recurrent flooding as a result of an increase in average rainfall coupled with heavier rainfall events, with knock-on impacts on the infrastructure, utility supply, and the urban economy of the Province. As the most urbanised province in Sri Lanka, these climate events pose a number of problems due to the rapid urban growth the province has undergone.

Administrative divisions

Districts
The Western Province is divided into three administrative districts, 40 Divisional Secretary's Divisions (DS Divisions) and 2,505 Grama Niladhari Divisions (GN Divisions).

Major population centres

Demographics

Population
The Western Province's population was 5,821,710 in 2012. The majority of the population are Sinhalese, with a minority Sri Lankan Moor and Sri Lankan Tamil population.

Ethnicity

Religion

Economy 

The Western province provides the highest contribution to the Gross Domestic Product contributing 41.2% of the Provincial Gross Domestic Product(PGDP) and has a nominal PGDP growth rate of 5.8% as of 2015. Agriculture only made up 1.7% of the GDP the lowest among the nine provinces while Industrial sector made up 34.6% the highest in the country and service sector represented 56.5%.

The province is undergoing rapid development with several of the largest infrastructure development projects happening in the province such as the Colombo International Financial City(CIFC) which is an International Financial Zone and the Western Region Megapolis Planning Project(WRMPP) Western province is also undergoing a major real estate and construction boom with residential and commercial buildings and skyscrapers changing the skylines of cities such as Colombo and Rajagiriya. Several major residential, office and hotel buildings as well as resorts and malls are either proposed or under construction.

The Colombo Harbour is also a major driver of economic growth being the busiest port in South Asia. It has both privately run and state owned terminals and is being expanded.

Education

Almost all the premier educational institutions in the island are located in the Western Province. Universities in the province includes the University of Colombo, University of Kelaniya, University of Moratuwa, University of Sri Jayewardenepura, Open University, Sri Lanka, Buddhist and Pali University of Sri Lanka, General Sir John Kotelawala Defence University, National Institute of Business Management and the Sri Lanka Institute of Information Technology. Having the highest population in all the provinces, Western Province has the largest number of schools in the country, which includes national, provincial, private and international schools.

Transportation

Expressways in Western Province

  Southern Expressway
  Outer Circular Expressway
  Colombo-Katunayake Expressway

International Highways in Western Province

National Highways in Western Province

  Kollupitiya to Sri Jayawardenapura Kotte
  Colombo to Dummaladeniya
  Colombo to Alutgama
  Colombo to kochchikade
  Colombo to Avissawella
  Panadura to Nambapana
  Ja Ela to Yakkala

See also
 List of settlements in Western Province (Sri Lanka)
 Provinces of Sri Lanka
 Districts of Sri Lanka

Notes

References

External links

 Western Provincial Council

 
1833 establishments in Ceylon
Provinces of Sri Lanka